The Fairlawne Chase was a National Hunt chase in England which was open to horses aged five years and older. 
It was run at Windsor over a distance of 3 miles (4,828 metres), and was scheduled to take place each year in February.

The race was first run in 1962 and was last run in 1997, when Windsor stopped hosting National Hunt racing.
National Hunt racing returned to Windsor temporarily in 2004 when Ascot was closed for renovations, and Windsor hosted the Long Walk Hurdle.

The race was a handicap before 1968, when it became a Conditions race, until its final year, when it was again run as a handicap.

The race was named after the establishment at Shipbourne Kent of the Queen Mother's racing trainer, Peter Cazalet.
The same name has now been given to a new race, the Fairlawne Handicap Chase  at Cheltenham, run at the New Year meeting.

Winners

References

Racing Post

Windsor Racecourse
National Hunt races in Great Britain
National Hunt chases
Discontinued horse races
Recurring sporting events established in 1962
1962 establishments in England
Recurring sporting events disestablished in 1997
1997 disestablishments in England